Croydon North  may refer to:
 Croydon North (UK Parliament constituency), a parliamentary constituency in Greater London, England
 Croydon North, Victoria, a suburb of the city of Melbourne, Australia